Kleeblattschaedel is a rare malformation of the head where there is a protrusion of the skull and broadening of the face. This condition is a severe type of craniosynostosis.

The condition can be both isolated or associated with other craniofacial dysostosises. 85% of children with this condition have other anomalies. Severe forms of the condition are often a sign of syndromic craniosynostosis combined with a grotesque constriction ring of the lambdoid structure and the squamosal bone or in another area.

Name and etymology 
Kleeblattschaedel (kleeblattschädel) is German for "cloverleaf skull". The disorder was named Kleeblattschaedel syndrome in 1958.

History 
The first case reported was back in 1849. The condition was first identified in 1960, and the first case in the United States was reported in 1965.

Causes 
The condition is caused by a premature fusing of the fibrous sutures. The condition is also caused by absence of the coronal and lambdoid sutures.

Conditions with kleeblattschaedel include:

 Antley-Bixler syndrome with genital anomalies and disordered steroidogenesis
 Beare-Stevenson cutis gyrata syndrome
 Carpenter syndrome
 Cranioectodermal dysplasia
 Crouzon syndrome
 Micromelic bone dysplasia with cloverleaf skull
 Osteoglophonic dysplasia
 Pfeiffer syndrome
 Thanatophoric dysplasia

Epidemiology 
The condition occurs equally in both males as in females.

References 

Congenital disorders of musculoskeletal system
Rare diseases
Congenital disorders of eye, ear, face and neck